Point Aconi can refer to several things:

 Point Aconi, Nova Scotia, a community on Boularderie Island.
 Point Aconi Generating Station, a power plant in the same community.